Eukaryota, whose members are known as eukaryotes, is a diverse domain of organisms whose cells have a nucleus. All animals, plants, fungi, and many unicellular organisms, are eukaryotes. They belong to the group of organisms Eukaryota or Eukarya, which is one of the three domains of life. Bacteria and Archaea (both prokaryotes) make up the other two domains.

The eukaryotes are usually now regarded as having emerged in the Archaea or as a sister of the Asgard archaea. This implies that there are only two domains of life, Bacteria and Archaea, with eukaryotes incorporated among archaea. Eukaryotes represent a small minority of the number of organisms, but, due to their generally much larger size, their collective global biomass is estimated to be about equal to that of prokaryotes. Eukaryotes emerged approximately 2.3–1.8 billion years ago, during the Proterozoic eon, likely as flagellated phagotrophs.  Their name comes from the Greek εὖ (eu, "well" or "good") and κάρυον (karyon, "nut" or "kernel").

Eukaryotic cells typically contain other membrane-bound organelles such as mitochondria and Golgi apparatus. Chloroplasts can be found in plants and algae. Prokaryotic cells may contain primitive organelles. Eukaryotes may be either unicellular or multicellular, and include many cell types forming different kinds of tissue. In comparison, prokaryotes are typically unicellular. Animals, plants, and fungi are the most familiar eukaryotes. Other eukaryotes are sometimes called protists.

Eukaryotes can reproduce both asexually through mitosis and sexually through meiosis and gamete fusion. In mitosis, one cell divides to produce two genetically identical cells. In meiosis, DNA replication is followed by two rounds of cell division to produce four haploid daughter cells that act as sex cells or gametes. Each gamete has just one set of chromosomes, each a unique mix of the corresponding pair of parental chromosomes resulting from genetic recombination during meiosis.

Cell features
Eukaryotic cells are typically much larger than those of prokaryotes, having a volume of around 10,000 times greater than the prokaryotic cell. They have a variety of internal membrane-bound structures, called organelles, and a cytoskeleton composed of microtubules, microfilaments, and intermediate filaments, which play an important role in defining the cell's organization and shape. Eukaryotic DNA is divided into linear bundles called chromosomes; these are separated into two matching sets by a microtubular spindle during nuclear division.

Internal membranes

Eukaryote cells include a variety of membrane-bound structures, collectively referred to as the endomembrane system. Simple compartments, called vesicles and vacuoles, can form by budding off other membranes. Many cells ingest food and other materials through a process of endocytosis, where the outer membrane invaginates and then pinches off to form a vesicle. It is probable that most other membrane-bound organelles are ultimately derived from such vesicles. Alternatively some products produced by the cell can leave in a vesicle through exocytosis.

The nucleus is surrounded by a double membrane known as the nuclear envelope, with nuclear pores that allow material to move in and out. Various tube- and sheet-like extensions of the nuclear membrane form the endoplasmic reticulum, which is involved in protein transport and maturation. It includes the rough endoplasmic reticulum where ribosomes are attached to synthesize proteins, which enter the interior space or lumen. Subsequently, they generally enter vesicles, which bud off from the smooth endoplasmic reticulum. In most eukaryotes, these protein-carrying vesicles are released and further modified in stacks of flattened vesicles (cisternae), the Golgi apparatus.

Vesicles may be specialized for various purposes. For instance, lysosomes contain digestive enzymes that break down most biomolecules in the cytoplasm. Peroxisomes are used to break down peroxide, which is otherwise toxic. Many protozoans have contractile vacuoles, which collect and expel excess water, and extrusomes, which expel material used to deflect predators or capture prey. In higher plants, most of a cell's volume is taken up by a central vacuole, which mostly contains water and primarily maintains its osmotic pressure.

Mitochondria

 Mitochondria are organelles found in all but one eukaryote, and are commonly referred to as "the powerhouse of the cell". Mitochondria provide energy to the eukaryote cell by oxidising sugars or fats and releasing energy as ATP. They have two surrounding membranes, each a phospholipid bi-layer; the inner of which is folded into invaginations called cristae where aerobic respiration takes place.
The outer mitochondrial membrane is freely permeable and allows almost anything to enter into the intermembrane space, while the inner mitochondrial membrane is semi permeable so allows only some required things into the mitochondrial matrix.

Mitochondria contain their own DNA, which has close structural similarities to bacterial DNA, and which encodes rRNA and tRNA genes that produce RNA which is closer in structure to bacterial RNA than to eukaryote RNA. They are now generally held to have developed from endosymbiotic prokaryotes, probably Alphaproteobacteria.

Some eukaryotes, such as the metamonads such as Giardia and Trichomonas, and the amoebozoan Pelomyxa, appear to lack mitochondria, but all have been found to contain mitochondrion-derived organelles, such as hydrogenosomes and mitosomes, and thus have lost their mitochondria secondarily. They obtain energy by enzymatic action on nutrients absorbed from the environment. The metamonad Monocercomonoides has also acquired, by lateral gene transfer, a cytosolic sulfur mobilisation system which provides the clusters of iron and sulfur required for protein synthesis. The normal mitochondrial iron-sulfur cluster pathway has been lost secondarily.

Plastids
Plants and various groups of algae also have plastids. Plastids also have their own DNA and are developed from endosymbionts, in this case cyanobacteria. They usually take the form of chloroplasts which, like cyanobacteria, contain chlorophyll and produce organic compounds (such as glucose) through photosynthesis. Others are involved in storing food. Although plastids probably had a single origin, not all plastid-containing groups are closely related. Instead, some eukaryotes have obtained them from others through secondary endosymbiosis or ingestion. The capture and sequestering of photosynthetic cells and chloroplasts occurs in many types of modern eukaryotic organisms and is known as kleptoplasty.

Endosymbiotic origins have also been proposed for the nucleus, and for eukaryotic flagella.

Cytoskeletal structures

Many eukaryotes have long slender motile cytoplasmic projections, called flagella, or similar structures called cilia. Flagella and cilia are sometimes referred to as undulipodia, and are variously involved in movement, feeding, and sensation. They are composed mainly of tubulin. These are entirely distinct from prokaryotic flagellae. They are supported by a bundle of microtubules arising from a centriole, characteristically arranged as nine doublets surrounding two singlets. Flagella also may have hairs, or mastigonemes, as in many Stramenopiles, and scales connecting membranes and internal rods. Their interior is continuous with the cell's cytoplasm.

Microfilamental structures composed of actin and actin binding proteins, e.g., α-actinin, fimbrin, filamin are present in submembranous cortical layers and bundles, as well. Motor proteins of microtubules, e.g., dynein or kinesin and actin, e.g., myosins provide dynamic character of the network.

Centrioles are often present even in cells and groups that do not have flagella, but conifers and flowering plants have neither. They generally occur in groups that give rise to various microtubular roots. These form a primary component of the cytoskeletal structure, and are often assembled over the course of several cell divisions, with one flagellum retained from the parent and the other derived from it. Centrioles produce the spindle during nuclear division.

The significance of cytoskeletal structures is underlined in the determination of shape of the cells, as well as their being essential components of migratory responses like chemotaxis and chemokinesis. Some protists have various other microtubule-supported organelles. These include the radiolaria and heliozoa, which produce axopodia used in flotation or to capture prey, and the haptophytes, which have a peculiar flagellum-like organelle called the haptonema.

Cell wall

The cells of plants and algae, fungi and most chromalveolates have a cell wall, a layer outside the cell membrane, providing the cell with structural support, protection, and a filtering mechanism. The cell wall also prevents over-expansion when water enters the cell.

The major polysaccharides making up the primary cell wall of land plants are cellulose, hemicellulose, and pectin. The cellulose microfibrils are linked via hemicellulosic tethers to form the cellulose-hemicellulose network, which is embedded in the pectin matrix. The most common hemicellulose in the primary cell wall is xyloglucan.

Differences among eukaryotic cells
There are many different types of eukaryotic cells, though animals and plants are the most familiar eukaryotes, and thus provide an excellent starting point for understanding eukaryotic structure. Fungi and many protists have some substantial differences, however.

Animal cell

All animals are eukaryotic. Animal cells are distinct from those of other eukaryotes, most notably plants, as they lack cell walls and chloroplasts and have smaller vacuoles. Due to the lack of a cell wall, animal cells can transform into a variety of shapes. A phagocytic cell can even engulf other structures.

Plant cell

Plant cells have a number of features that distinguish them from the cells of the other eukaryotic organisms. These include:
 A large central vacuole (enclosed by a membrane, the tonoplast), which maintains the cell's turgor and controls movement of molecules between the cytosol and sap
 A primary cell wall containing cellulose, hemicellulose and pectin, deposited by the protoplast on the outside of the cell membrane; this contrasts with the cell walls of fungi, which contain chitin, and the cell envelopes of prokaryotes, in which peptidoglycans are the main structural molecules
 The plasmodesmata, pores in the cell wall that link adjacent cells and allow plant cells to communicate with adjacent cells. Animals have a different but functionally analogous system of gap junctions between adjacent cells.
 Plastids, especially chloroplasts, organelles that contain chlorophyll, the pigment that gives plants their green color and allows them to perform photosynthesis
 Bryophytes and seedless vascular plants only have flagellae and centrioles in the sperm cells. Sperm of cycads and Ginkgo are large, complex cells that swim with hundreds to thousands of flagellae.
 Conifers (Pinophyta) and flowering plants (Angiospermae) lack the flagellae and centrioles that are present in animal cells.

Fungal cell

The cells of fungi are similar to animal cells, with the following exceptions:
 A cell wall that contains chitin
 Less compartmentation between cells; the hyphae of higher fungi have porous partitions called septa, which allow the passage of cytoplasm, organelles, and, sometimes, nuclei; so each organism is essentially a giant multinucleate supercell – these fungi are described as coenocytic. Primitive fungi have few or no septa.
 Only the most primitive fungi, chytrids, have flagella.

Other eukaryotic cells
Some groups of eukaryotes have unique organelles, such as the cyanelles (unusual plastids) of the glaucophytes, the haptonema of the haptophytes, or the ejectosomes of the cryptomonads. Other structures, such as pseudopodia, are found in various eukaryote groups in different forms, such as the lobose amoebozoans or the reticulose foraminiferans. Structures known as cortical alveoli are vesicles present under the cell membrane of many protists such as dinoflagellates, ciliates and apicomplexan parasites.

Reproduction

Cell division generally takes place asexually by mitosis, a process that allows each daughter nucleus to receive one copy of each chromosome. Most eukaryotes also have a life cycle that involves sexual reproduction, alternating between a haploid phase, where only one copy of each chromosome is present in each cell and a diploid phase, wherein two copies of each chromosome are present in each cell. The diploid phase is formed by fusion of two haploid gametes to form a zygote, which may divide by mitosis or undergo chromosome reduction by meiosis. There is considerable variation in this pattern. Animals have no multicellular haploid phase, but each plant generation can consist of haploid and diploid multicellular phases.

Eukaryotes have a smaller surface area to volume ratio than prokaryotes, and thus have lower metabolic rates and longer generation times.

The evolution of sexual reproduction may be a primordial and fundamental characteristic of eukaryotes. Based on a phylogenetic analysis, Dacks and Roger proposed that facultative sex was present in the common ancestor of all eukaryotes. A core set of genes that function in meiosis is present in both Trichomonas vaginalis and Giardia intestinalis, two organisms previously thought to be asexual. Since these two species are descendants of lineages that diverged early from the eukaryotic evolutionary tree, it was inferred that core meiotic genes, and hence sex, were likely present in a common ancestor of all eukaryotes. Eukaryotic species once thought to be asexual, such as parasitic protozoa of the genus Leishmania, have been shown to have a sexual cycle. Also, evidence now indicates that amoebae, previously regarded as asexual, are anciently sexual and that the majority of present-day asexual groups likely arose recently and independently.

Classification

In antiquity, the two lineages of animals and plants were recognized. They were given the taxonomic rank of Kingdom by Linnaeus. Though he included the fungi with plants with some reservations, it was later realized that they are quite distinct and warrant a separate kingdom, the composition of which was not entirely clear until the 1980s. The various single-cell eukaryotes were originally placed with plants or animals when they became known. In 1818, the German biologist Georg A. Goldfuss coined the word protozoa to refer to organisms such as ciliates, and this group was expanded until it encompassed all single-celled eukaryotes, and given their own kingdom, the Protista, by Ernst Haeckel in 1866. The eukaryotes thus came to be composed of four kingdoms:
 Kingdom Protista
 Kingdom Plantae
 Kingdom Fungi
 Kingdom Animalia

The protists were understood to be "primitive forms", and thus an evolutionary grade, united by their primitive unicellular nature. The disentanglement of the deep splits in the tree of life only really started with DNA sequencing, leading to a system of domains rather than kingdoms as top level rank being put forward by Carl Woese, uniting all the eukaryote kingdoms under the eukaryote domain. At the same time, work on the protist tree intensified, and is still actively going on today. Several alternative classifications have been forwarded, though there is no consensus in the field.

Eukaryotes are a clade usually assessed to be sister to Heimdallarchaeota in the Asgard grouping in the Archaea. In one proposed system, the basal groupings are the Opimoda, Diphoda, the Discoba, and the Loukozoa. The Eukaryote root is usually assessed to be near or even in Discoba.

A classification produced in 2005 for the International Society of Protistologists, which reflected the consensus of the time, divided the eukaryotes into six supposedly monophyletic 'supergroups'. However, in the same year (2005), doubts were expressed as to whether some of these supergroups were monophyletic, particularly the Chromalveolata, and a review in 2006 noted the lack of evidence for several of the supposed six supergroups. A revised classification in 2012 recognizes five supergroups.

There are also smaller groups of eukaryotes whose position is uncertain or seems to fall outside the major groups – in particular, Haptophyta, Cryptophyta, Centrohelida, Telonemia, Picozoa, Apusomonadida, Ancyromonadida, Breviatea, and the genus Collodictyon. Overall, it seems that, although progress has been made, there are still very significant uncertainties in the evolutionary history and classification of eukaryotes. As Roger & Simpson said in 2009 "with the current pace of change in our understanding of the eukaryote tree of life, we should proceed with caution." Newly identified protists, purported to represent novel, deep-branching lineages, continue to be described well into the 21st century; recent examples including Rhodelphis, putative sister group to Rhodophyta, and Anaeramoeba, anaerobic amoebaflagellates of uncertain placement.

Phylogeny

The rRNA trees constructed during the 1980s and 1990s left most eukaryotes in an unresolved "crown" group (not technically a true crown), which was usually divided by the form of the mitochondrial cristae; see crown eukaryotes. The few groups that lack mitochondria branched separately, and so the absence was believed to be primitive; but this is now considered an artifact of long-branch attraction, and they are known to have lost them secondarily.

It has been estimated that there may be 75 distinct lineages of eukaryotes. Most of these lineages are protists.

The known eukaryote genome sizes vary from 8.2 megabases (Mb) in Babesia bovis to 112,000–220,050 Mb in the dinoflagellate Prorocentrum micans, showing that the genome of the ancestral eukaryote has undergone considerable variation during its evolution. The last common ancestor of all eukaryotes is believed to have been a phagotrophic protist with a nucleus, at least one centriole and cilium, facultatively aerobic mitochondria, sex (meiosis and syngamy), a dormant cyst with a cell wall of chitin and/or cellulose and peroxisomes. Later endosymbiosis led to the spread of plastids in some lineages.

Although there is still considerable uncertainty in global eukaryote phylogeny, particularly regarding the position of the root, a rough consensus has started to emerge from the phylogenomic studies of the past two decades. The majority of eukaryotes can be placed in one of two large clades dubbed Amorphea (similar in composition to the unikont hypothesis) and the Diaphoretickes, which includes plants and most algal lineages. A third major grouping, the Excavata, has been abandoned as a formal group in the most recent classification of the International Society of Protistologists due to growing uncertainty as to whether its constituent groups belong together. The proposed phylogeny below includes only one group of excavates (Discoba), and incorporates the recent proposal that picozoans are close relatives of rhodophytes.

In some analyses, the Hacrobia group (Haptophyta + Cryptophyta) is placed next to Archaeplastida, but in others it is nested inside the Archaeplastida. However, several recent studies have concluded that Haptophyta and Cryptophyta do not form a monophyletic group. The former could be a sister group to the SAR group, the latter cluster with the Archaeplastida (plants in the broad sense).

The division of the eukaryotes into two primary clades, bikonts (Archaeplastida + SAR + Excavata) and unikonts (Amoebozoa + Opisthokonta), derived from an ancestral biflagellar organism and an ancestral uniflagellar organism, respectively, had been suggested earlier. A 2012 study produced a somewhat similar division, although noting that the terms "unikonts" and "bikonts" were not used in the original sense.

A highly converged and congruent set of trees appears in Derelle et al. (2015), Ren et al. (2016), Yang et al. (2017) and Cavalier-Smith (2015) including the supplementary information, resulting in a more conservative and consolidated tree. It is combined with some results from Cavalier-Smith for the basal Opimoda. The main remaining controversies are the root, and the exact positioning of the Rhodophyta and the bikonts Rhizaria, Haptista, Cryptista, Picozoa and Telonemia, many of which may be endosymbiotic eukaryote-eukaryote hybrids. Archaeplastida acquired chloroplasts probably by endosymbiosis of a prokaryotic ancestor related to a currently extant cyanobacterium, Gloeomargarita lithophora.

Cavalier-Smith's tree 

Thomas Cavalier-Smith 2010, 2013, 2014, 2017 and 2018 places the eukaryotic tree's root between Excavata (with ventral feeding groove supported by a microtubular root) and the grooveless Euglenozoa, and monophyletic Chromista, correlated to a single endosymbiotic event of capturing a red-algae. He et al. specifically supports rooting the eukaryotic tree between a monophyletic Discoba (Discicristata + Jakobida) and an Amorphea-Diaphoretickes clade.

Evolutionary history

Origin of eukaryotes 

The origin of the eukaryotic cell, also known as eukaryogenesis, is a milestone in the evolution of life, since eukaryotes include all complex cells and almost all multicellular organisms. A number of approaches have been used to find the first eukaryote and their closest relatives. The last eukaryotic common ancestor (LECA) is the hypothetical last common ancestor of all living eukaryotes, and was most likely a biological population.

Eukaryotes have a number of features that differentiate them from prokaryotes, including an endomembrane system, and unique biochemical pathways such as sterane synthesis. A set of proteins called eukaryotic signature proteins (ESPs) was proposed to identify eukaryotic relatives in 2002: They have no homology to proteins known in other domains of life at that time, but they appear to be universal among eukaryotes. They include proteins that make up the cytoskeleton, the complex transcription machinery, membrane-sorting systems, the nuclear pore, as well as some enzymes in the biochemical pathways.

Fossils
The timing of this series of events is hard to determine; Knoll (2006) suggests they developed approximately 1.6–2.1 billion years ago. Some acritarchs are known from at least 1.65 billion years ago, and the possible alga Grypania has been found as far back as 2.1 billion years ago. The Geosiphon-like fossil fungus Diskagma has been found in paleosols 2.2 billion years old.

Organized living structures have been found in the black shales of the Palaeoproterozoic Francevillian B Formation in Gabon, dated at 2.1 billion years old. Eukaryotic life could have evolved at that time. Fossils that are clearly related to modern groups start appearing an estimated 1.2 billion years ago, in the form of a red algae, though recent work suggests the existence of fossilized filamentous algae in the Vindhya basin dating back perhaps to 1.6 to 1.7 billion years ago.

The presence of eukaryotic-specific biomarkers (steranes) in Australian shales previously indicated that eukaryotes were present in these rocks dated at 2.7 billion years old, which was even 300 million years older than the first geological records of the appreciable amount of molecular oxygen during the Great Oxidation Event. However, these Archaean biomarkers were eventually rebutted as later contaminants. Currently, putatively the oldest biomarker records are only ~800 million years old. In contrast, a molecular clock analysis suggests the emergence of sterol biosynthesis as early as 2.3 billion years ago, and thus there is a huge gap between molecular data and geological data, which hinders a reasonable inference of the eukaryotic evolution through biomarker records before 800 million years ago. The nature of steranes as eukaryotic biomarkers is further complicated by the production of sterols by some bacteria.

Whenever their origins, eukaryotes may not have become ecologically dominant until much later; a massive uptick in the zinc composition of marine sediments  has been attributed to the rise of substantial populations of eukaryotes, which preferentially consume and incorporate zinc relative to prokaryotes, approximately a billion years after their origin (at the latest).

In April 2019, biologists reported that the very large medusavirus, or a relative, may have been responsible, at least in part, for the evolutionary emergence of complex eukaryotic cells from simpler prokaryotic cells.

Relationship to Archaea
The nuclear DNA and genetic machinery of eukaryotes is more similar to Archaea than Bacteria, leading to a controversial suggestion that eukaryotes should be grouped with Archaea in the clade Neomura. In other respects, such as membrane composition, eukaryotes are similar to Bacteria. Three main explanations for this have been proposed:
 Eukaryotes resulted from the complete fusion of two or more cells, wherein the cytoplasm formed from a bacterium, and the nucleus from an archaeon, from a virus, or from a pre-cell.
 Eukaryotes developed from Archaea, and acquired their bacterial characteristics through the endosymbiosis of a proto-mitochondrion of bacterial origin.

Alternative proposals include:

 The chronocyte hypothesis postulates that a primitive eukaryotic cell was formed by the endosymbiosis of both archaea and bacteria by a third type of cell, termed a chronocyte. This is mainly to account for the fact that eukaryotic signature proteins were not found anywhere else by 2002.
 The last universal common ancestor of the tree of life was a complex organism that survived a mass extinction event rather than an early stage in the evolution of life. Eukaryotes and in particular akaryotes (Bacteria and Archaea) evolved through reductive loss, so that similarities result from differential retention of original features.

Assuming no other group is involved, there are three possible phylogenies for the Bacteria, Archaea, and Eukaryota in which each is monophyletic. These are labelled 1 to 3 in the table below, with a modification of hypothesis 2 making the 4th column: The eocyte hypothesis, in which the Archaea are paraphyletic. (The table and the names for the hypotheses are based on Harish & Kurland, 2017.)

In recent years, most researchers have favoured either the three domains (3D) or the eocyte hypothesis. An rRNA analysis supports the eocyte scenario, apparently with the Eukaryote root in Excavata. A cladogram supporting the eocyte hypothesis, positioning eukaryotes within Archaea, based on phylogenomic analyses of the Asgard archaea, is:

In this scenario, the Asgard group is seen as a sister taxon of the TACK group, which comprises Thermoproteota (formerly named eocytes or Crenarchaeota), Nitrososphaerota (formerly Thaumarchaeota), and others. This group is reported contain many of the eukaryotic signature proteins and produce vesicles.

In 2017, there was significant pushback against this scenario, arguing that the eukaryotes did not emerge within the Archaea. Cunha et al. produced analyses supporting the three domains (3D) or Woese hypothesis (2 in the table above) and rejecting the eocyte hypothesis (4 above). Harish and Kurland found strong support for the earlier two empires (2D) or Mayr hypothesis (1 in the table above), based on analyses of the coding sequences of protein domains. They rejected the eocyte hypothesis as the least likely. A possible interpretation of their analysis is that the universal common ancestor (UCA) of the current tree of life was a complex organism that survived an evolutionary bottleneck, rather than a simpler organism arising early in the history of life. On the other hand, the researchers who came up with Asgard re-affirmed their hypothesis with additional Asgard samples. Since then, the publication of additional Asgard archaeal genomes and the independent reconstruction of phylogenomic trees by multiple independent laboratories have provided additional support for an Asgard archaeal origin of eukaryotes.

Details of the relation of Asgard archaea members and eukaryotes are still under consideration, although, in January 2020, scientists reported that Candidatus Prometheoarchaeum syntrophicum, a type of cultured Asgard archaea, may be a possible link between simple prokaryotic and complex eukaryotic microorganisms about two billion years ago.

Endomembrane system and mitochondria
The origins of the endomembrane system and mitochondria are also unclear. The phagotrophic hypothesis proposes that eukaryotic-type membranes lacking a cell wall originated first, with the development of endocytosis, whereas mitochondria were acquired by ingestion as endosymbionts. The syntrophic hypothesis proposes that the proto-eukaryote relied on the proto-mitochondrion for food, and so ultimately grew to surround it. Here the membranes originated after the engulfment of the mitochondrion, in part thanks to mitochondrial genes (the hydrogen hypothesis is one particular version).

In a study using genomes to construct supertrees, Pisani et al. (2007) suggest that, along with evidence that there was never a mitochondrion-less eukaryote, eukaryotes evolved from a syntrophy between an archaea closely related to Thermoplasmatales and an alphaproteobacterium, likely a symbiosis driven by sulfur or hydrogen. The mitochondrion and its genome is a remnant of the alphaproteobacterial endosymbiont. The majority of the genes from the symbiont have been transferred to the nucleus. They make up most of the metabolic and energy-related pathways of the eukaryotic cell, while the information system (DNA polymerase, transcription, translation) is retained from archaea.

Hypotheses
Different hypotheses have been proposed as to how eukaryotic cells came into existence. These hypotheses can be classified into two distinct classes – autogenous models and chimeric models.

Autogenous models

Autogenous models propose that a proto-eukaryotic cell containing a nucleus existed first, and later acquired mitochondria. According to this model, a large prokaryote developed invaginations in its plasma membrane in order to obtain enough surface area to service its cytoplasmic volume. As the invaginations differentiated in function, some became separate compartments – giving rise to the endomembrane system, including the endoplasmic reticulum, golgi apparatus, nuclear membrane, and single membrane structures such as lysosomes.

Mitochondria are proposed to come from the endosymbiosis of an aerobic proteobacterium after a eukaryote with a nucleus has evolved. This theory is less held onto because it requires extra assumptions to explain current conditions. For example, as every known eukaryote has a mitochondrion (or at least show signs of having an ancestor that had), one must assumed that all the eukaryotic lineages that did not acquire mitochondria became extinct. The theory also does not explain why  anaerobic variants of mitochondria have evolved.

Chimeric models
Chimeric models claim that two prokaryotic cells existed initially – an archaeon and a bacterium. The closest living relatives of these appears to be Asgardarchaeota and (distantly related) the alphaproteobacteria called the proto-mitochondrion. These cells underwent a merging process, either by a physical fusion or by endosymbiosis, thereby leading to the formation of a eukaryotic cell. Within these chimeric models, some studies further claim that mitochondria originated from a bacterial ancestor while others emphasize the role of endosymbiotic processes behind the origin of mitochondria.

The inside-out hypothesis
The inside-out hypothesis suggests that the fusion between free-living mitochondria-like bacteria, and an archaeon into a eukaryotic cell happened gradually over a long period of time, instead of in a single phagocytotic event. In this scenario, an archaeon would trap aerobic bacteria with cell protrusions, and then keep them alive to draw energy from them instead of digesting them. During the early stages the bacteria would still be partly in direct contact with the environment, and the archaeon would not have to provide them with all the required nutrients. But eventually the archaeon would engulf the bacteria completely, creating the internal membrane structures and nucleus membrane in the process.

It is assumed the archaean group called halophiles went through a similar procedure, where they acquired as much as a thousand genes from a bacterium, way more than through the conventional horizontal gene transfer that often occurs in the microbial world, but that the two microbes separated again before they had fused into a single eukaryote-like cell.

An expanded version of the inside-out hypothesis proposes that the eukaryotic cell was created by physical interactions between two prokaryotic organisms and that the last common ancestor of eukaryotes got its genome from a whole population or community of microbes participating in cooperative relationships to thrive and survive in their environment. The genome from the various types of microbes would complement each other, and occasional horizontal gene transfer between them would be largely to their own benefit. This accumulation of beneficial genes gave rise to the genome of the eukaryotic cell, which contained all the genes required for independence.

The serial endosymbiotic hypothesis

According to serial endosymbiotic theory (championed by Lynn Margulis), a union between a motile anaerobic bacterium (like Spirochaeta) and a thermoacidophilic crenarchaeon (like Thermoplasma which is sulfidogenic in nature) gave rise to the present day eukaryotes. This union established a motile organism capable of living in the already existing acidic and sulfurous waters. Oxygen is known to cause toxicity to organisms that lack the required metabolic machinery. Thus, the archaeon provided the bacterium with a highly beneficial reduced environment (sulfur and sulfate were reduced to sulfide). In microaerophilic conditions, oxygen was reduced to water thereby creating a mutual benefit platform. The bacterium on the other hand, contributed the necessary fermentation products and electron acceptors along with its motility feature to the archaeon thereby gaining a swimming motility for the organism.

From a consortium of bacterial and archaeal DNA originated the nuclear genome of eukaryotic cells. Spirochetes gave rise to the motile features of eukaryotic cells. Endosymbiotic unifications of the ancestors of alphaproteobacteria and cyanobacteria, led to the origin of mitochondria and plastids respectively. For example, Thiodendron has been known to have originated via an ectosymbiotic process based on a similar syntrophy of sulfur existing between the two types of bacteria – Desulfobacter and Spirochaeta.

However, such an association based on motile symbiosis has never been observed practically. Also there is no evidence of archaeans and spirochetes adapting to intense acid-based environments. In addition, the theory posits that mitochondrion-less eukaryotes have existed, tying back to the problem in the autogenous model.

The hydrogen hypothesis
In the hydrogen hypothesis, the symbiotic linkage of an anaerobic and autotrophic methanogenic archaeon (host) with an alphaproteobacterium (the symbiont) gave rise to the eukaryotes. The host's methanogenic environment worked as a sink for H2, which resulted in heightened bacterial fermentation.

Endosymbiotic gene transfer acted as a catalyst for the host to acquire the symbionts' carbohydrate metabolism and turn heterotrophic in nature. Subsequently, the host's methane forming capability was lost. Thus, the origins of the heterotrophic organelle (symbiont) are identical to the origins of the eukaryotic lineage. In this hypothesis, the presence of H2 represents the selective force that forged eukaryotes out of prokaryotes.

The syntrophy hypothesis
The syntrophy hypothesis was developed in contrast to the hydrogen hypothesis and proposes the existence of two symbiotic events. According to this model, the origin of eukaryotic cells was based on metabolic symbiosis (syntrophy) between a methanogenic archaeon and a deltaproteobacterium. This syntrophic symbiosis was initially facilitated by H2 transfer between different species under anaerobic environments. In earlier stages, an alphaproteobacterium became a member of this integration, and later developed into the mitochondrion. Gene transfer from a deltaproteobacterium to an archaeon led to the methanogenic archaeon developing into a nucleus. The archaeon constituted the genetic apparatus, while the deltaproteobacterium contributed towards the cytoplasmic features.

This theory incorporates two selective forces at the time of nucleus evolution
 presence of metabolic partitioning to avoid the harmful effects of the co-existence of anabolic and catabolic cellular pathways, and
 prevention of abnormal protein biosynthesis due to a vast spread of introns in the archaeal genes after acquiring the mitochondrion and losing methanogenesis.

6+ serial endosymbiosis scenario
A complex scenario of 6+ serial endosymbiotic events of archaea and bacteria has been proposed in which mitochondria and an asgard related archaeota were acquired at a late stage of eukaryogenesis, possibly in combination, as a secondary endosymbiont. The findings have been rebuked as an artifact.

See also 

 Eukaryote hybrid genome
 Evolution of sexual reproduction
 List of sequenced eukaryotic genomes
 Parakaryon myojinensis
 Prokaryote
 Nitrososphaerota
 Vault (organelle)

Notes

References

External links 

 "Eukaryotes" (Tree of Life Web Project)
 
 Attraction and sex among our microbial Last Eukaryotic Common Ancestors, The Atlantic, November 11, 2020

 
Articles containing video clips
Eukaryote